Peter Demens ( – January 21, 1919) born Pyotr Alexeyevitch Dementyev was a Russian nobleman who migrated in 1881 to the United States and became a railway owner and one of the founders of the of St. Petersburg, Florida, United States.

Early life

Pyotr A. Dementyev was born to a wealthy family in Vesyegonsky District, Tver Oblast, Russia. Demens was a liberally minded, well-educated aristocrat, a first cousin of Prince Petroff and a captain in the Imperial Guard. His father died when he was an infant, leaving him two estates, one near the czar's capital of St. Petersburg and another close to Moscow. His mother died when he was 4. He reportedly grew up in a stone house with servants and became master of his family estate at 17. He received training as a forester managing his large family estates, which would serve him well in the future.

Demens was raised by his maternal uncle Anastassy Alexandrovich Kaliteevsky, marshal of the Vesyegonsk district nobility, who became the boy's tutor and guardian of his land estates. When he was 10, Demens was sent to St. Petersburg to study at Gymnasium No. 3. Demens did well enough to transfer to the First Technical School in St. Petersburg.

In 1867, he became a lieutenant in the czar's infantry guard. He rose through the ranks to command sentries at the czar's Winter Palace and the home of Crown Prince Alexander III. Four years later, he resigned his commission and became a squire. He married Raisa Borisenko, who was also an orphan brought up by relatives. He was elected as county marshal of nobility, and became an outspoken writer and active in his rural government. It is reported that Demens sympathized with populist leaders and never adopted Marxist or radical notions.

He became outspoken about the Czarist regime and left Russia following the assassination of Czar Alexander II in 1881. In 1880 he was exiled from Russia, and he anglicized his name to Peter Demens.

In the United States
In May 1881, "leaving his family behind, [Demens] sailed for New York, hoping for American promise of mobility and opportunity". He reportedly "spent his sea voyage studying an English language textbook". "Arriving in New York with $3,000 to start a new life, Demens embarked for Florida" ("spending one day in New York before boarding a train bound for his cousin's Jacksonville orange grove"). Because land in Jacksonville was expensive for him at the time, Demens took "a steamer to the back country, where he expected to get more for his money".

He decided to enter the lumber business ("investing in a sawmill and a construction company in Longwood, Fla."), and in 1885 Demens was supplying railroad ties to the narrow-gauge Orange Belt Railway.  When the railroad could not pay its debts, Demens took over its charter. As owner of the railroad, Demens "[extended] its lines to link Kissimmee with Jacksonville and Tampa Bay" (with the help of Hamilton Disston). Among potential investors, he successfully invited and entertained Philip D. Armour in Florida, and named a train depot in his honor. Demens went into great debt to get the line completed, and sold it in 1889; the railroad eventually was bought by Henry B. Plant, owner of the Plant System of railroads.

Demens co-founded St. Petersburg with John Constantine Williams Sr. On June 8, 1888 the first train pulled into the terminus in southern Pinellas County (the end of the line) with one passenger. The area had no official name and no real streets or sidewalks. After a drawing of straws, Demens won and named the location of his terminus St. Petersburg, Florida, after Saint Petersburg, Russia, where he had spent half his youth. Williams would have named it Detroit, which name was given to the first hotel.

Death and legacy

Demens eventually retired to Alta Loma, California to the family ranch (what later became known as Demens-Tolstoy Estate). Reportedly, "the descendants of Peter Demens now live in California and British Columbia, [including] a grandson, Peter Demens Tolstoy ("writer Leo Tolstoy, who wrote Anna Karenina and The Death of Ivan Ilych, is his great-grand uncle"), a great-grandson, Greg Demens, and a great-great-grandson, Greg Demens." Demens Landing in St. Petersburg, Florida is named in his honor.

In 1979, a granite monument was erected in St. Petersburg, Florida in memory of the founder of the city, who named it after St. Petersburg, Russia.

Notes

References
 Gene Burnett. "Florida's Past: People and Events That Shaped the State". Pineapple Press. August 1998. History – 280 pages. .
 Grismer, Karl H. "The Story of St. Petersburg". St. Petersburg, FL: P. K. Smith, 1948.
 Peter Demens. "My Life in America".
 Mohoff, George & Jack Valov. "A Stroll Through Russiantown" 1996. Chapter 13, pp. 83–88, "Captain Peter A. Demens".

External links
 
Peter and Ann Tolstoy, Oral Histories, City of Cucamonga, California
The Historical Marker Database Demens' Marker in St. Petersburg, Florida
When Florida Boom Went Bust, Russian Nobleman Turned To Writing, By Jim Robison, Orlando Sentinel, March 23, 2003.
Дементьев Петр Алексеевич // Иванян Э. А. Энциклопедия российско-американских отношений. XVIII-XX века. — Москва: Международные отношения, 2001. — 696 с. — .

Russian nobility
1850 births
1919 deaths
People from St. Petersburg, Florida
American city founders
People from Vesyegonsky District
Emigrants from the Russian Empire to the United States
19th-century American businesspeople